Vidhgar (also known as Vidhgarë and Villgar) is a settlement in the former Ana e Malit municipality, Shkodër County, northern Albania. At the 2015 local government reform it became part of the municipality Shkodër.

References

Ana e Malit
Populated places in Shkodër
Villages in Shkodër County